Hemiandrus nox, the night ground wētā, is a species of ground wētā endemic to New Zealand. During the day, this wētā hides in burrows in the soil and is active only at night (they are nocturnal). The species is found in native forests in North and South Island.  Females of this species have medium-long curved ovipositers to lay their eggs in the soil. Unlike some Hemiandrus species, H. nox does not show maternal care.

Taxonomy 
Hemiandrus nox was first described in 2016, but had been referred to in previous publications by an informal (tag) name (Hemiandrus 'alius'). The species name comes from Nox, the Roman goddess of the night.

Habitat/distribution 
Hemiandrus nox are endemic to the North and South Island of New Zealand, but restricted to mature native forest. This species is most abundant in North-west Nelson. They are a nocturnal species and found in burrows in the ground during the day. Hemiandrus nox is sympatric with three other Hemiandrus species and is host to the intracellular bacteria Wollbachia.

Conservation 
The New Zealand Department of Conservation classified this species as not threatened

Diet 
Hemiandrus nox is probably omnivorous, but has only been observed eating invertebrates such as cicada

Morphology 
This species is very similar in appearance to the three species within the Hemiandrus maculifrons-complex. Adult females have a medium-long length, strongly curved ovipositor with dark patches at its base. The head and body of adults are small and dark brown with a cream and brown clypeus; sometimes with small pale patches on the pronotum. The three apical segments of the maxillary palps have fine microsetae. The spines on their legs can be used to distinguish them from sympatric species: their mid tibiae has three spines along the inferior retrolateral angle (excluding apical spine), and their hind tibiae has no inferior articulated spines. In addition male teminalia are unique.

References 

Weta
Endemic fauna of New Zealand
Insects described in 2016
Anostostomatidae
Endemic insects of New Zealand